Neobisium maritimum is a species of pseudoscorpions in the Neobisiidae family.

Description
It has two pairs of eyes that are positioned at the front of the cephalothorax. The colour of it is black, with orange-red claws.

Distribution
Maritime Western Europe.

Habitat
It can be found in rock crevices, and under stones.

References

Neobisiidae
Animals described in 1817
Arachnids of Europe